Count Three & Pray is the fourth studio album by American new wave band Berlin, released on October 13, 1986, by Geffen Records. The album spawned four singles, including "Take My Breath Away", which was featured in the film Top Gun. The single topped the Billboard Hot 100 and won the Academy Award for Best Original Song in 1986.

Track listing

Personnel
Credits adapted from the liner notes of Count Three & Pray.

Berlin
 John Crawford – bass, background vocals
 Terri Nunn – vocals
 Rob Brill – drums, background vocals

Additional musicians
 Gene Black, Kane Roberts, David Gilmour, Ted Nugent, Alan Murphy, Elliot Easton, Steve Dougherty, Gregg Wright – guitars
 Bob Ezrin, Peter Robinson, Greg Kuehn, Jun Sato – keyboards
 Gary Barlough – Synclavier programming
 Andy Richards – keyboards programming, keyboards 
 John Batdorf, William Batstone, Lance Ellington, George Merrill, Tessa Niles, The Art Damage Choir – background vocals
 Richard Niles – orchestration 
 Luís Jardim – percussion 
 Patrick O'Hearn – fretless bass 
 Masakazu Yoshizawa – shakuhachi 
 Osamu Kitajima – koto, biwa

Technical

 Bob Ezrin – production ; recording ; mixing 
 Berlin – production 
 Andy Richards – production 
 Giorgio Moroder – production, mixing 
 David Tickle – recording ; mixing 
 Ted Hayton – recording 
 Brian Reeves – mixing 
 Mike Shipley – mixing 
 Russ Castillo, Steve Strassman, Peter Lewis, Bob Mithoff, Dave Concors, Michael Rosen, Tom Whitlock – additional recording
 Jeff Bennett, Tom Nist, Charlie Brocco, Robin Laine, Paul Gomersall, Steve Lyon – recording assistance
 Stephen Marcussen – mastering at Precision Lacquer (Hollywood)

Artwork
 Dean Chamberlain – front cover photo
 PWR, Matthew Rolston, Middelkoop, Rob Nunn – other photos
 Janet Levinson – design

Charts

Certifications

Notes

References

1986 albums
Albums produced by Bob Ezrin
Albums produced by Giorgio Moroder
Berlin (band) albums
Geffen Records albums